Desulfohalobium retbaense is a bacterium, the type species of its genus. It is halophilic, sulfate-reducing, motile, nonsporulating and rod-shaped with polar flagella. The type strain is strain DSM 5692. Its genome has been sequenced.

References

Further reading

External links 
LPSN

Type strain of Desulfohalobium retbaense at BacDive -  the Bacterial Diversity Metadatabase

Bacteria described in 1991
Desulfovibrionales